Vladimir Valeryevich Vasin (born 19 January 1983 in Moscow) is a former Russian football player.

References

1983 births
Footballers from Moscow
Living people
Russian footballers
FC Moscow players
Russian Premier League players
Association football midfielders
FC Spartak Moscow players
FC Olimp-Dolgoprudny players